AGHS may refer to:

Education 
 Albert Gallatin High School, Uniontown, Pennsylvania, US
 Allen Glen High School, Roodepoort, Gauteng, South Africa
 Allerton Grange School, Leeds, England
 Arroyo Grande High School, Arroyo Grande, California, US
 Ashland-Greenwood High School, Ashland, Nebraska, US
 Asquith Girls High School, Sydney, New South Wales, Australia
 Auburn Girls High School, Auburn, New South Wales, Australia
 Avon Grove High School, West Grove, Pennsylvania, US
 Avonside Girls' High School, Christchurch, Canterbury, New Zealand
 Ayden-Grifton High School, Ayden, North Carolina, US

Organizations 
 AGHS Legal Aid Cell, non-governmental organization (NGO) in Pakistan
 Akron General Health System, in Akron, Ohio, US
 Australian Garden History Society

Other uses 
 Hull classification symbol, used by the US Navy for "patrol combatant support ship"

 , the chemical equation for silver hydrosulfide